Devendra Murdeshwar (19 September 1923 – 29 January 2000) was an Indian bansuri flutist.

Early life
Murdeshwar was born in 1923 in a Brahmin family in Masur in the Mysore State in Karnataka. His father played the violin, tabla and the bansuri flute as a hobby. Devendra first also learned flute and tabla before shifting to the flute.

Career
He had an early interest in music. In 1941 he went to Bombay to study under Pannalal Ghosh. He was a staff artist at All India Radio Delhi. Through his work he came in contact with musicians such as Allauddin Khan, Omkarnath Thakur, Mallikarjun Mansur and Bade Ghulam Ali Khan. Along with Pannalal Ghosh he was one of India's leading flutists in the 20th century.

Death
Murdeshwar died on 29 January 2000 from a heart attack aged 77.

References

1923 births
2000 deaths
Indian flautists
Bansuri players
Indian classical musicians
People from Mysore
People from Mumbai
20th-century flautists
Recipients of the Sangeet Natak Akademi Award